Early Childhood Research Quarterly is an academic journal providing current research (predominantly empirical) in the field of early childhood (birth through eight years of age) education and development that was established in 1986. The journal also publishes occasional book reviews, practitioner/policy perspectives, and research reviews. Its focus is on education, policy, and social relevance, seeking links between research and practice. The journal is published four times a year by Elsevier and sponsored by the National Association for the Education of Young Children. Its previous publishers were Pergamon Press and Ablex Publishing. The editor in chief is Laura Justice (Ohio State University). Previous editors include Adam Winsler (George Mason University), Karen E. Diamond (Purdue University) and the founding editor was Lilian G. Katz.

References

External links
 

Elsevier academic journals
Publications established in 1986
Early childhood education
Education journals